Péronnelle (c. 1330 – 30 October 1397) was Countess of Dreux from 1365 to 1377 and Viscountess of Thouars from 1370 to 1397. She was the daughter of Joan II, Countess of Dreux and Louis I, Viscount of Thouars. With her death, the elder branch of the House of Thouars, which had controlled the viscounty for more than five centuries, ended.

She first married, in 1345, Amaury IV de Craon, lord of Craon, Saint-Maure, Chantocé, Ingrande, and Sablé. After he died in 1373, she married in 1376 Rouault de Boisménard, called Tristan, lord of the Île de Ré, Marans, and Gamanches, son of André I and Marie de Montfaucon. He died in 1396. Both husbands became viscount of Thouars jure uxoris upon their marriage to Péronnelle.

In 1378, Charles V of France ceded Benon and its dependencies to Péronnelle and Tristan in exchange for the County of Dreux. Two letters by Gilbert Hasté, castellan and captain of Benon, declared the execution of this order by Charles on 28 August and 1 September. Wealthy due to this sale, the couple made several gifts to churches, notably to the Jacobin convent at Thouars.

Sources

Dreux, Péronnelle, Countess of
Dreux, Péronnelle, Countess of
Counts of Dreux
14th-century women rulers